Chima Akachukwu (born 28 May 2000) is a Nigerian cricketer. He played in the 2016 ICC World Cricket League Division Five tournament, making his debut for the national team at the age of 15.

In May 2019, he was named in Nigeria's squad for the Regional Finals of the 2018–19 ICC T20 World Cup Africa Qualifier tournament in Uganda. He made his Twenty20 International (T20I) debut for Nigeria against Botswana on 21 May 2019. In October 2019, he was named in Nigeria's squad for the 2019 ICC T20 World Cup Qualifier tournament in the United Arab Emirates.

In October 2021, he was named in Nigeria's squad for the Regional Final of the 2021 ICC Men's T20 World Cup Africa Qualifier tournament in Rwanda.

References

External links
 

2000 births
Living people
Nigerian cricketers
Nigeria Twenty20 International cricketers
People from Sagamu